The 1908 Geneva Covenanters football team was an American football team that represented Geneva College as an independent during the 1908 college football season. Led by second-year head coach, Arthur McKean, the team compiled a record of 1–6–2.

Schedule

References

Geneva
Geneva Golden Tornadoes football seasons
Geneva Covenanters football